Goldwyn is both a surname and a given name. Notable people with the name include:

Surname
Beryl Goldwyn (born 1930), English ballerina
John Goldwyn (born 1958), American film producer
Liz Goldwyn (born 1976), American film director
Robert Goldwyn (1930–2010), American surgeon and writer
Samuel Goldwyn (1879–1974), American film producer
Samuel Goldwyn Jr. (1926–2015), American film producer
Tony Goldwyn (born 1960), American actor

Given name
Goldwyn Arthur Martin (1913–2001), Canadian judge
Goldwyn Prince (born 1974), Antigua and Barbuda cricketer

See also
Metro-Goldwyn-Mayer, an American media company
Goldwyn Pictures, a defunct American media company

Jewish surnames